Edie Fake (born 1980) is an American artist, illustrator, author, and transgender activist. Fake is known for their comics/zines, gouache and ink paintings, and murals. Fake has an award winning comic-zine series about Gaylord Phoenix, a bird-like man that travels to different environments and has various lovers. He is currently based in Joshua Tree, California, after previously residing in Chicago and Los Angeles.

Early life and education 
Fake was born in 1980 and raised in Evanston, Illinois. In 2002, Fake received a B.F.A. degree in Film, Animation and Video (FAV) from Rhode Island School of Design (RISD). After graduating from RISD, Fake worked as a negative cutter for approximately 6 years, and started working in comics, collage and drawing, and translating their animation into two dimensional work because it was more accessible.

In 2015, he had been enrolled at Roski School of Art at University of Southern California (USC) and was one of the seven artists (nicknamed the "USC7") that dropped out of the school in protest of the mistreatment by the administration.

Work 
Fakes work uses visual abstraction in their work as an exploration of identity in the transgender and queer experience. The Gaylord Phoenix short comics series started in 2002. In the illustrated book, Gaylord Phoenix (2010) there is expression of desire and transformation happening to a bird-like man in a dream-like, fantasy environment.

In the illustrated book, Memory Palaces (2014), Fake reimagines the facades of historical queer spaces in Chicago in abstract, fantasy-like paintings of architecture, which are used as a metaphor for the transgender body. Both with architecture and the human body, these exist as structures and present decoration and protective features, and both of these are vulnerability due to shifts in U.S. politics and social change. Additionally in the exhibition of the same name, Memory Palaces (2013), at Thomas Robertello Gallery in Chicago, there were a series of drawings titled "Gateway", where Fake pays tribute the death of his five artist friends, Mark Aguhar, Nick Djandji, Dara Greenwald, Flo McGarrell, and Dylan Williams.

Fake won the 2011 Ignatz Award for "Outstanding Graphic Novel" for Gaylord Phoenix. In 2019, Fake was one of the guests of honors at MoCCA Festival by the Society of Illustrators.

Exhibitions 
This is a list of select exhibitions of Edie Fake's work, separated by the type of exhibition and listed by year of exhibition.

Solo exhibitions 
 2019–2020 – Affordable Housing for Trans Elders, solo art wall/mural, Berkeley Art Museum and Pacific Film Archive (BAMPFA), Berkeley, California
 2019–2020  – Edie Fake: Labyrinth, Drawing Center, New York City, New York
 2018 – Edie Fake: Structure Shifts, Everson Museum, Syracuse, New York
 2016 – Edie Fake, Marlborough Chelsea, New York City, New York
 2013 – Memory Palaces, solo exhibition, Thomas Robertello Gallery, Chicago, Illinois

Group exhibitions 
 2019 – Queer Forms, Katherine E. Nash Gallery, University of Minnesota, Minneapolis, Minnesota
 2019 – Queer Abstraction, Des Moines Art Center, Des Moines, Iowa
 2019 – Queer California: Untold Stories, Oakland Museum of California (OMCA), Oakland, California
 2018 – Surface/Depth: The Decorative After Miriam Schapiro, Museum of Arts and Design (MAD), New York City, New York
 2018 – Declaration, Institute for Contemporary Art (ICA), Virginia Commonwealth University (VCU), Richmond, Virginia
 2017 – A Dazzling Decade: Works Acquired Over the Past 10 Years, Nerman Museum of Contemporary Art (NMOCA), Johnson County Community College, Overland Park, Kansas
 2016 – Tomorrow Never Happens, Samek Gallery, Bucknell University, Lewisburg, Pennsylvania

Publications

References

External links 
 Article: Cities of the Future, Their Color by Renee Gladman and Edie Fake (Summer 2018) in the Paris Review
Video: Rad Queers - Edie Fake (2013) on vimeo
Podcast: Episode 346: Edie Fake (2015) on RiYL (Recommended If You Like), Apple Podcasts

1980 births
Living people
Rhode Island School of Design alumni
Artists from Evanston, Illinois
People from Joshua Tree, California
Queer artists
Artists from Chicago
American LGBT rights activists
Transgender artists
LGBT comics creators
LGBT people from Illinois